Santorre Derossi Di Santa Rosa (21 April 1894 – 24 March 1981) was an Italian equestrian. He competed in the individual jumping event at the 1920 Summer Olympics.

References

External links
 

1894 births
1981 deaths
Italian male equestrians
Olympic equestrians of Italy
Equestrians at the 1920 Summer Olympics
Sportspeople from Venice